Moozhikkal is a small town on Wayanad Road in Kozhikode East, Kerala, India. 
Moozhikkal is administered by Kozhikode Corporation which is a local city council here.

Important Landmarks
 Jama'at Juma musjid 
 
 Moozhikkal Kavu Bhagavathy Temple
 Moozhikkal Madathil Kunnummal Maha Vishnu Temple

Sacred Groves
Moozhikkal purayidam sarppakavu is a sacred grove of Moozhikkal.
There is another sacred grove for monkeys near Moozhikkal.

Medical College Road
Moozhikkal junction has become prominent because it forks to Calicut Medical College and Parambil Bazar areas.

Indian Institute of Spices Research
Indian Institute of Spices Research is located near Moozhikkal.  This organization is a subsidiary of Indian Council of Agricultural Research, a federal agency of the Government of India.  
The Institute was established in 1975. The institute provides project based education at masters and doctorate levels.  Ph.D. is offered in Biochemistry, Botany, Horticulture, Hematology and Soil Chemistry.  The institute has a number of fully equipped labs.

References

Kozhikode east